D503 is a state road in the northern Dalmatia region of Croatia that provides access from the A1 motorway's Benkovac interchange to the D8 state road, facilitating access from A1 motorway to Biograd na Moru and surrounding seaside resorts.

The southern terminus of the road is located in Biograd na Moru ferry port, from where Jadrolinija ferries fly to Tkon island.

At its northern terminus, the road connects to D27 state road which serves as a parallel road to the A1 motorway, connecting to Gračac (to the north) facilitating a bypass of Maslenica bridges in case of strong winds preventing use of both of the bridges.

The road, as well as all other state roads in Croatia, is managed and maintained by Hrvatske ceste, a state-owned company.

Traffic volume 

Traffic is regularly counted and reported by Hrvatske ceste, operator of the road. Substantial variations between annual (AADT) and summer (ASDT) traffic volumes are attributed to the fact that the road connects a number of summer resorts to Croatian motorway network.

Road junctions

Sources

State roads in Croatia
Transport in Zadar County